"Sunspots" is a song by the English singer-songwriter Julian Cope. It is the only single released in support of his second album Fried.

Formats and track listing 
All songs written by Julian Cope.
UK 7" single (MER 182)
"Sunspots" – 5:14
"I Went on a Chourney" – 2:28

UK double 7" single (MER 1822)
"Sunspots" – 5:14
"I Went on a Chourney" – 2:28
"Mik Mak Mok" – 4:47
"Land of Fear" – 5:10

Personnel 
Julian Cope – vocals, bass guitar, rhythm guitar, piano, organ
Steve Lovell – electric guitar, recorder solo 
Donald Ross Skinner – slide and electric guitar
Chris Whitten – drums
Steve "Brother Johnno" Johnson – electric guitar solo 
Kate St. John – oboe
David Carter - tuba on 
Technical
Paul King - production supervisor
Paul "Chas" Watkins - engineer, recorded by
P. St. John Nettleton - art direction, design
Donato Cinicolo - photography

Accolades

Chart positions

References

External links 
 

1984 songs
1985 singles
Julian Cope songs
Songs written by Julian Cope
Mercury Records singles